Elixir is the debut studio album by Australian jazz band Elixir, released in May 2003 and peaked at number 24 on the ARIA Charts. The band was formed in Brisbane in 1997 by Katie Noonan and Nick Stewart from ARIA award winning, double-platinum selling band george and River Petein.

Track listing
 "Tip of Memory" (Katie Noonan, Nick Stewart, Martin Challis) – 5:16
 "River Man" (Nick Drake) – 5:00
 "Before You Sleep" (Katie Noonan, Nick Stewart, Martin Challis) – 3:33
 "Raspberry Tea" (Katie Noonan, Martin Challis) – 3:54
 "Breath of Grace" (Katie Noonan, Nick Stewart, Martin Challis) – 5:51
 "Blue" (Vince Jones) – 4:07
 "Essence of My Love" (Katie Noonan, Martin Challis) – 3:57
 "Saigon Battle Children 1972" (Katie Noonan, Nick Stewart, Martin Challis) – 7:44
 "Goodbye Yellow Brick Road" (Elton John) – 4:27
 "Harvest of Rain" (Katie Noonan, Nick Stewart, Martin Challis) – 2:25
 "String Interlude" (Paul Grabowsky) – 1:02
 "Mists of Ruse" (Katie Noonan, Martin Challis) – 2:50
 "Overlap" (Ani DiFranco) – 3:33
 "Second Sight" (Jamie Clark, Leah Cotterell, Meg Kanowsli) – 3:44
 "Drunk on Her Taste" (Katie Noonan) – 4:11
 "River and Moon" (Katie Noonan, Martin Challis) – 4:03
 "River of She" (Isaac Hurren, Martin Challis) – 2:13

Weekly charts

Credits
 Artwork – Benjamin Portas
 Cello [string quartet] – Dan Curro
 Co-producer – Isaac Hurren, Nick Stewart
 Composed by [horns], arranged by [horns] – Isaac Hurren
 Composed by [strings], arranged by [strings] – Paul Grabowsky
 Euphonium [horn trio] – Thomas Humphrey
 Flugelhorn [horn trio] – Dale Richardson, John Hoffman
 Mastered by – Oscar Gaona
 Photography by [band and road] – Nina
 Recorded by [strings and horns] – Jonathan Shakhovsky, Justin Tresidder
 Viola [string quartet] – Brett Dean
 Violin [string quartet] – John Rodgers, Sarah Curro

Release history

References

External links
 

2003 debut albums
Festival Records albums
Elixir (Australian band) albums